Darbahan (also Romanized as Darbahān and Darbakhan) is a village in Qaqazan-e Gharbi Rural District, in the Central District of Takestan County, Qazvin Province, Iran. At the 2006 census, its population was 513, in 130 families.

References 

Populated places in Takestan County